Thunder Mountain Speedway was a 3/10 mile dirt track racing facility in East Texas located just north of Rusk, Texas, United States, on U.S. Route 69. Dubbed the "Potato Chip" for its unique shape, the track was a favorite of many drivers. The facility fell on hard times in its last few years of operation, and closed in 2006.

External links 
 

Buildings and structures in Cherokee County, Texas
Dirt oval race tracks in the United States
Motorsport venues in Texas